SaleHoo Group Limited is a New Zealand based e-commerce company that manages SaleHoo.com, a website specializing in global trading between wholesalers and retailers. It is one of the largest wholesale directories on the Internet and one of the first to offer international wholesale contacts.

History and Origin
The company was founded in 2005 by New Zealand-born entrepreneurs Simon Slade and Mark Ling in Christchurch, New Zealand. While Slade worked full-time for Hewlett-Packard, he also sold on New Zealand’s local online auction site, Trade Me. After receiving numerous inquiries about where he found his suppliers, Slade recognized the demand for a directory of verified suppliers.

Together, Slade and Ling each contributed $500 to launch SaleHoo. Other expenses they begged, borrowed or promised to pay later. SaleHoo reached 10,000 members just eight months after its creation and currently serves over 100,000 retailers and eBay sellers, primarily in the US, United Kingdom, Canada and Australia. SaleHoo’s parent company, Doubledot Media Limited was named the 23rd fastest-growing company in New Zealand on the Deloitte/Unlimited Fast 50 index.

Operation & Products
As of March 2018, SaleHoo offers three products:
 Wholesale Directory
 Market Research Lab
 SaleHoo Stores

See also
B2B Network

References

External links
Official site

Online marketplaces of New Zealand
Internet properties established in 2005
Software companies of New Zealand